Nikolai Nikolayevich Sidelnikov (June 5, 1930, Tver – June 20, 1992) was a Russian Soviet composer.

Sidelnikov studied with E. O. Messner and Yuri Shaporin at the Moscow Conservatory. He taught at the Moscow Conservatory where he was a professor from 1981. Among his pupils were Audronė Žigaitytė, Vyacheslav Artemov, Eduard Artemyev, Dmitri Smirnov, Vladimir Tarnopolsky, Vladimir Martynov, Anton Rovner, Sergey Pavlenko, Ivan Glebovich Sokolov and Vladimir Bitkin. 

His works include operas: 
Alen'kiy Tsvetochek (The Scarlet Flower, after S. Aksakov, 1974) 
Chertogon (opera dilogy after Nikolai Leskov: Zagul, Pokhmelye, 1978–1981)
Beg (The Run after Mikhail Bulgakov, 1987)
a ballet: 
Stepan Razin
and also: 6 symphonies, an oratorio, cantatas, choral, chamber and vocal music.
Russkie skazki (Русские сказки — The Russian Fairy Tales, 1968) - a concert for 12 players is one of his most notable compositions.

External links
 Memorial site

Russian male classical composers
Soviet composers
Soviet male composers
Russian opera composers
Male opera composers
1930 births
1992 deaths
Moscow Conservatory alumni
20th-century classical composers
Burials in Troyekurovskoye Cemetery
20th-century Russian male musicians